Viktor Ryabchenko (born 8 September 1982) is a Kazakhstani alpine skier. He competed in two events at the 2006 Winter Olympics.

References

1982 births
Living people
Kazakhstani male alpine skiers
Olympic alpine skiers of Kazakhstan
Alpine skiers at the 2006 Winter Olympics
Sportspeople from Almaty
Alpine skiers at the 2003 Asian Winter Games
Alpine skiers at the 2007 Asian Winter Games